Dobrociesz  is a village in the administrative district of Gmina Iwkowa, within Brzesko County, Lesser Poland Voivodeship, in southern Poland. 

The village has a population of 2,000.

References

Dobrociesz